Didangia is a genus of flatworms belonging to the order Polycladida. It is the only genus in the monotypic family Didangiidae.

Species
There are two species recognised in the genus Didangia:
 Didangia carneyi Quiroga, Bolanos & Litvaitis, 2008
 Didangia mactanensis Faubel, 1983

References

Platyhelminthes